Charles Ferren Hopkins Sr. (May 16, 1842 – February 14, 1934) was the last surviving Union Civil War soldier in New Jersey that was a recipient of the Medal of Honor. He served as Mayor of Boonton, New Jersey.

Biography
He was born on May 16, 1842, in Hope Township, New Jersey to Nathan Hopkins (1811–1889) and Ann Wilson and he had a brother, John Robertson Hopkins (1844–1885). He served as Mayor of Boonton, New Jersey. He was married in about 1867; his wife died in 1931. Four daughters survived him, and three sons: Emmet, Frank, and Charles Ferren Hopkins Jr. (1884–1956). He was interred at Greenwood Cemetery, Boonton.

References

External links

 

1842 births
1934 deaths
People of New Jersey in the American Civil War
Union Army soldiers
United States Army Medal of Honor recipients
Mayors of places in New Jersey
People from Hope Township, New Jersey
American Civil War recipients of the Medal of Honor